Ionela Loaieș (born February 2, 1979 in Comănești) is a Romanian artistic gymnast. She is an Olympic bronze medalist and a world gold medalist with the team.

References

External links
 
 
 
 

1979 births
Living people
Romanian female artistic gymnasts
Gymnasts at the 1996 Summer Olympics
Olympic gymnasts of Romania
Olympic bronze medalists for Romania
Medalists at the World Artistic Gymnastics Championships
Olympic medalists in gymnastics
Medalists at the 1996 Summer Olympics
20th-century Romanian women